Konny Mogoy is a rural locality (a selo) in Novokrasinsky Selsoviet of Volodarsky District, Astrakhan Oblast, Russia. The population was 122 as of 2010. There are 5 streets.

Geography 
Konny Mogoy is located on the Konnaya River, 25 km east of Volodarsky (the district's administrative centre) by road. Novokrasnoye is the nearest rural locality.

References 

Rural localities in Volodarsky District, Astrakhan Oblast